Leptodactylodon ornatus is a species of frog in the family Arthroleptidae. It is endemic to western Cameroon. Common name ornate egg frog has been proposed for it.

Two subspecies may be distinguished:
 Leptodactylodon ornatus ornatus Amiet, 1971 – Mount Manengouba, Mount Nlonako, Mount Kupe, the Bonandam Hills and the Ebonji Hills
 Leptodactylodon ornatus permaculatus Amiet, 1971 – southern and western slopes of the Bamileke Plateau at Fotabong, Foto, and the Mbos Cliffs

Leptodactylodon ornatus is found at low to medium altitudes ( above sea level) in hilly areas, usually near mountains in areas of high rainfall. It occurs in wet lowland and submontane forests and can also occur in partially degraded forest. Males call from cracks in rocks or from under stones. The tadpoles develop in fast-flowing streams. It is likely to be threatened by habitat loss caused by forest clearance for smallholder farming, expanding human settlements and logging. Chytridiomycosis might also be a threat. It is not known to occur in any protected areas.

References

ornatus
Frogs of Africa
Amphibians of Cameroon
Endemic fauna of Cameroon
Amphibians described in 1971
Taxonomy articles created by Polbot